This is a discography of the Bolton, England rock band Kinesis.

Discography

Studio albums
Handshakes For Bullets (29 September 2003)
You Are Being Lied to (6 June 2005)

You Are Being Lied To 

You Are Being Lied to is Kinesis' second and follow up album to Handshakes For Bullets. It is also the final release made by the band just before they split up in 2005. Released 29 September 2003 by Captains of Industry and financed by the band.

Having been dropped by their former label, Independiente Records, in January 2004, the band still had songs left in them. Unable to find a new contract, they went about themselves, recording the new material at G-Scpae Studios Manchester during the summer of 2004. By autumn it was complete and taken on by small company Captains of Industry.

The record was finally released in 2005, and on the day of release, Kinesis announced that it would be no longer.

No singles were released from the album.

Track listing

 "A Voice to Preserve – 3:23
 "You Are Being Lied to" – 2:40
 "Everything You Thought You Knew to Be" – 3:52
 "Principles Are a Luxury" – 2:22
 "Perception Management" – 3:35
 "Like Vultures" – 3:31
 "Have My Sympathy" – 3:08
 "Rainbow in the Night" - 3:35
 "A Prayer For Death" – 2:37
 "The Question Has Changed" – 4:23

Personnel
Michael Bromley (Vocals, Guitar, Keyboard)
Conor McGloin (Guitar, Vocals)
Tom Marshall (Bass guitar, Vocals)
Neil Chow (Drums, Vocals)

Singles

Non-mainstream singles

(Available For Purchase at Kinesis gigs)
"And They Obey" (25 February 2002)
"Everything Destroys Itself" (5 August 2002)

EPs

Worship Yourself (February 2001)

Demos

The Flowers Are Dead EP (December 2000)

Unreleased songs

Unreleased material from You Are Being Lied to sessions
"Vibrations of Sincerity" 
"Your Sugar Is Poison"

"Beauty From Afar"
"Conor1"
"I Am The Light"
"Night Time Song"
"Save The Wales"
"Something Is Coming"
"The Boy With The Thorn In His Side" (Smiths Cover)
"These Forgotten Words"

References

Kinesis(band)
Rock music group discographies